Bishopton RFC is a rugby union side based in Bishopton, Renfrewshire, Scotland.

History

The club was founded in 1994.

They play their home games at Holmpark, formerly the Royal Ordnance Factory playing fields. The club's crest reflects that Ordnance history.

Bishopton Community Trust received a cheque for £300,000 from British Aerospace to help develop the sporting infrastructure at Bishopton including the Bishopton rugby clubhouse and pitches. The club are now looking to develop a 3G pitch. The club has built new clubhouse facilities.

The rugby club has its own tartan, which was designed to celebrate the club's Silver anniversary.

Sides

The club runs two senior XV men's sides; and junior sides for boys and girls. The club has also launched a women's side.

Notable former players

References 

Rugby union in Renfrewshire
Scottish rugby union teams
Rugby clubs established in 1994